G.W. Rogers was a tugboat active on the Great Lakes.

She was built in 1919, at Great Yarmouth, in the United Kingdom.
Her previous names included: Ballen Balloch, West Hope and Ocean Gull.

She helped free the lake freighter George M. Carl, when she ran aground off the mouth of the Humber River, in 1975.
     
The G.W. Rogers sank at her moorings at Rensselaer, New York in December 1987. A port official told the Schenectady Gazette that the vessel was so rusty her name was "nearly illegible". The Schenectady Gazette reported that a floating crane would have to be brought from New York City to salvage the tug, as the combined weight of the vessel and a land-based crane would overwhelm the moorings.

References

1919 ships
Ships built in England
Tugboats of Canada
Tugboats on the Great Lakes